Frank Browning may refer to:

 Frank Browning (baseball) (1882–1948), American baseball player
 Frank Browning (author), American author and correspondent for National Public Radio
 Frank V. Browning (1882–1930), British explorer of Antarctica